Gijón (or, in Asturian, Xixón; official name: Gijón/Xixón) is one of eight comarcas (this is the Spanish word; the Asturian is cotarros), administrative divisions of Asturias, which is a province and an autonomous community in Spain .

The comarca of Gijón is divided into three municipalities (in Asturian conceyos). From east to west they are:
Villaviciosa
Gijón / Xixón
Carreño

Comarcas of Asturias